The E.P. Compilation is a compilation album by Swedish band Refused, originally released in 1997. The album, which consists of songs from Refused's EPs, was reissued in 1999 as This Album Contains Old Songs & Old Pictures, Vol. 1. A different edition was released in 2002 and reissued in 2004.

Overview 

The 2002 and 1997 versions are very different. Although they both contain most of Refused's singles, the 1997 version contains many rarities, such as the Misfits cover "Bullet," to which Epitaph was unable to secure the rights for 2002 re-release.

Track listing 

Tracks 1-4 taken from The New Noise Theology E.P. (1998), tracks 5-9 taken from the Rather Be Dead E.P. (1996), tracks 10-16 taken from the Everlasting E.P. (1995)

Personnel 
Refused
 Dennis Lyxzén – lead vocals
 Kristofer Steen – guitar, bass
 Jon Brännström – guitar, backing vocals, synthesizer
 Magnus Björklund – bass
 David Sandström – drums

Additional
 Thomas Di Leva – additional vocals on "Jag Äter Inte Mina Vänner"
 Pelle Gunnerfeldt – producer, engineer
 Pelle Henricsson – engineer, mastering
 Fred Estby – engineer
 Eskil Lövström – engineer
 Tomas Skogsberg – engineer

References 

Refused albums
1997 compilation albums
2003 compilation albums
Burning Heart Records compilation albums